Kukiya (also Romanized as Kūkīyā and Kūkīā) is a village in Baranduzchay-ye Jonubi Rural District, in the Central District of Urmia County, West Azerbaijan Province, Iran. At the 2006 census, its population was 659, in 160 families.

References 

Populated places in Urmia County

 bite